Implicit contract may refer to either of these related concepts:
 Implied-in-fact contract in law
 Implicit contract theory in economics